All the Best is a 2012 Telugu film written and directed by J. D. Chakravarthy. The film stars Srikanth, J. D. Chakravarthy and Sidhika Sharma in lead roles. The film was released on 29 June 2012 with mixed reviews and became one of the successful films of 2012. Especially Telangana Shakuntala's character of Waheed Rehman was much praised by the critics and audiences. Although the film tanked at the box office and declared as flop. Later this film was dubbed into Hindi as Risk. The film is  remake of the Malayalam film Gulumaal: The Escape, which itself is based on the 2000 Argentinian movie Nine Queens.

Cast
 Srikanth as Ravi
 J. D. Chakravarthy as Chandu
 Sidhika Sharma as Lucky 
 Anisha Singh as Upasana 
 Chandra Mohan as Chandu's father 
 Kota Srinivasa Rao as Ravi's father
 Brahmanandam as Gochi Savithri
 Raghu Babu as SI Patvardhan Patel
 Brahmaji as Machiraju
 Krishna Bhagavaan as Sharma 
 Pradeep Rawat as Razak
 Rao Ramesh as Babji
 Ranganath
 Jeeva
 Raghu Karumanchi as Police Constable
 Suthivelu
 Y. Vijaya as Chamundeswaeri Devi
 Telangana Shakuntala as Waheed Rehman
 Pragathi

Soundtrack

The audio of the films was launched on 3 June 2012 at Dasapalla Hotel in Hyderabad. The soundtrack was composed by singer turned composer Hemachandra and the album was released under Aditya Musiclabel. All the songs in the album were penned by young lyricist Geetha Poonik.

References

External links
 

2012 films
2010s Telugu-language films
Indian comedy films
Telugu remakes of Malayalam films
Indian remakes of foreign films
2012 comedy films